Cana Island is an island in Lake Michigan in the town of Baileys Harbor in Door County, Wisconsin, United States. The Cana Island Light is on the east side of the island. It is possible to walk to Cana Island from the mainland over the tombolo when water levels are low. Tombolo conditions are monitored by a webcam operated by the county parks department. The island is part of the Town of Baileys Harbor, Wisconsin.

In 1896 the wooden bulk freighter Australasia burned and sank off Cana Island.

Gallery

Climate

References

External links 
 Cana Island, Web-Map of Door County, Wisconsin

Islands of Door County, Wisconsin
Islands of Lake Michigan in Wisconsin